Austin Matelson (born March 10, 1985) is an American professional wrestler and television personality currently signed to All Elite Wrestling (AEW), where he performs under the ring name Luchasaurus, where he is a former AEW World Tag Team Champion. He is also known for his work in Lucha Underground as Vibora and also works the independent circuit under the Luchasaurus gimmick. He was signed to WWE where he wrestled under the ring name Judas Devlin in NXT. He was also a house-guest on the reality competition, Big Brother 17, in which he placed 5th.

Professional wrestling career

WWE (2012–2014)
In 2012, Matelson signed a developmental contract with WWE and was sent for training at FCW where he was given the ring name Judas Devlin. On August 1, 2012, he made his FCW debut teaming with Corey Graves defeating Briley Pierce and CJ Parker. In 2012, FCW was renamed NXT and Devlin transferred to the new development brand, performing mainly at house shows. Austin was released in 2014 after a severe hip injury.

Independent circuit (2016–2019)
Matelson made his return to professional wrestling in 2016, having not competed since his release from WWE in 2014. On June 17, 2016, in a match for Millenium Pro Wrestling (MPW) under the ring name Austin Draven, he defeated Ryan J. Morales. On September 30, 2016, under the ring name Just Judas he defeated Danny Divine to become MPW Heavyweight Champion.

On November 9, 2017, Matelson teamed with fellow Big Brother contestant Jessie Godderz under the team name Team Big Brother, they defeated HATE (Peter Avalon and Ray Rosas) in a match for Bar Wrestling.

After Matelson used the Víbora character in Lucha Underground, he started to use the character in the independent circuit. He changed the name to Luchasaurus after fans chanted that during his Lucha Underground debut. On November 17 and 18, Matelson wrestled for House of Hardcore under the new gimmick and ring name Luchasaurus, defeating Alex Reynolds on the first night and winning on the second night in a three-way by defeating Matt Riddle and Willie Mack.

Lucha Underground (2016–2018)
In May 2016, Matelson under a mask and the ring name Vibora made his Lucha Underground debut as a part of the Reptile Tribe stable. On May 7, 2016, Vibora along with Pindar and Drago won the Lucha Underground Trios Championship. Reptile Tribe lost the Lucha Underground Trios Championship against Dante Fox, Killshot and The Mack.

On the July 18, 2018, episode of Lucha Underground Vibora defeated Johnny Mundo.

On the August 1, 2018, episode of Lucha Underground The character Vibora was "killed off" via decapitation by a sword-wielding Taya Valkyrie.

All Elite Wrestling (2019–present)
On May 25, 2019, Matelson debuted for All Elite Wrestling (AEW) at Double or Nothing as a part of the pre-show Casino Battle Royale. He lasted until the final three, before being eliminated by Adam Page. Three days later it was revealed that he had signed with the company full-time as Luchasaurus. He would then go on to form a tag team with Jungle Boy as he managed him at Fyter Fest and teamed up with him at Fight for the Fallen in a Triple Threat tag team match involving The Dark Order and Angelico and Jack Evans in a losing effort. At All Out, Luchasaurus alongside Jungle Boy and Marko Stunt would debut as the stable "Jurassic Express". On the August 18, 2021 episode of Dynamite, Jurassic Express had a match for the AEW World Tag Team Championship against the Young Bucks, but failed. On the January 5, 2022 episode of Dynamite, the Jurassic Express defeated the Lucha Brothers to win their first AEW World Tag Team Championship. The team would then defend the titles against the Young Bucks and reDRagon (Kyle O'Reilly and Bobby Fish) in a triple-threat tag team match at Revolution.

After Jungle Boy and Luchasaurus lost the titles on a special edition Dynamite named Road Rager, Cage turned on Jungle Boy, with Luchasaurus also turning heel when he joined Christian Cage. At the start of his alliance with Cage, Luchasaurus was presented as a “monster heel” and started squashing multiple opponents within minutes, all at Cage’s direction.  

At Fyter Fest week 2, Luchasaurus turned on Christian Cage to realign with Jungle Boy, however, this was also a short-lived reunion. At the All Out event, Luchasaurus cemented himself as a heel by attacking Jungle Boy once again and solidifying his alliance with Christian Cage.

In other media
In the summer of 2015, Matelson appeared as a contestant in the 17th season of Big Brother. He was evicted during the twelfth week and placed fifth.

Filmography

Personal life
Before beginning studies at California State University, Northridge, Matelson had been entirely homeschooled. He earned two history degrees at CSUN—a B.A. in 2008 and a M.A. in 2010, with his master's concentration and thesis in medieval literature. While in the Big Brother house, Matelson began a relationship with Liz Nolan. The two continued to date for five months before breaking up in February 2016.

Bill DeMott scandal
In late February and March 2015, several former NXT trainees previously working within the WWE developmental system alleged misconduct by head trainer Bill DeMott, with Devlin and Brandon Traven publicizing complaints which they claimed they had submitted to WWE management about DeMott back in March 2013, when they were still employed with WWE. Meanwhile, other ex-trainees like Briley Pierce and Derrick Bateman also made allegations in 2015, while previous allegations made in 2013 by Chad Baxter and Chase Donovan were also noted. They accused DeMott of making trainees perform dangerous drills, physically assaulting and bullying trainees, using homophobic and racial slurs amongst other derogatory terms, and condoning sexual harassment. WWE released statements regarding some of the claims that came to light in 2013 and 2015, saying that investigations were done and no wrongdoing was found. On March 6, 2015, DeMott denied the allegations, but resigned from WWE "to avoid any embarrassment or damage" to the company.

Championships and accomplishments

All Elite Wrestling
 AEW World Tag Team Championship (1 time) – with Jungle Boy 
 All-Star Wrestling
 ASW Tag Team Championship (1 time) – with  The Thunder From Jalandhar
 DDT Pro-Wrestling
 Ironman Heavymetalweight Championship (1 time)
 Lucha Underground
 Lucha Underground Trios Championship (1 time) – with Drago and Pindar
Pro Wrestling Illustrated
Ranked No. 105 of the top 500 singles wrestlers in the PWI 500 in 2020
 Millennium Pro Wrestling
 MPW Heavyweight Championship (1 time)

References

External links

Judas Devlin's WWE NXT profile

1985 births
21st-century professional wrestlers
All Elite Wrestling personnel
AEW World Tag Team Champions
American male professional wrestlers
Big Brother (American TV series) contestants
California State University, Northridge alumni
Living people
Masked wrestlers
Participants in American reality television series
People from Woodland Hills, Los Angeles
Professional wrestlers from California
Sportspeople from Los Angeles
Ironman Heavymetalweight Champions